Moureaux Islands are two islands and off-lying rocks lying  west-northwest of Pelletan Point in Flandres Bay, off the west coast of Graham Land. They were first charted and named by members of the Belgian Antarctic Expedition under Gerlache, who made a landing on one of the islands in February 1898.

See also 
 List of Antarctic and sub-Antarctic islands

Islands of Graham Land
Danco Coast